Carol Galea (born 24 October 1962) is a retired Maltese long-distance runner. She represented her country at two Olympic Games, in 1992 and 1996, as well as the 1995 World Championships.

Galea still holds national records in multiple events.

Competition record

Personal bests
Outdoor
800 metres – 2:15.16 (Valletta 1993)
1500 metres – 4:33.41 (Barcelona 1992)
3000 metres – 9:39.97 (Dublin 1994)
5000 metres – 16:43.8 (Marsa 1995)
10,000 metres – 34:25.1 (Watford 1997)
Half marathon – 1:17:52 (Palermo 2003)
Marathon – 2:36:53 (Florence 1998)

References

External links
 

1962 births
Living people
Maltese female long-distance runners
Olympic athletes of Malta
Athletes (track and field) at the 1992 Summer Olympics
Athletes (track and field) at the 1996 Summer Olympics
Commonwealth Games competitors for Malta
Athletes (track and field) at the 1994 Commonwealth Games
Athletes (track and field) at the 1998 Commonwealth Games
Athletes (track and field) at the 2002 Commonwealth Games
World Athletics Championships athletes for Malta
Athletes (track and field) at the 1997 Mediterranean Games
Athletes (track and field) at the 2005 Mediterranean Games
Mediterranean Games silver medalists for Malta
Mediterranean Games medalists in athletics
Maltese female cross country runners
Maltese female marathon runners